(Barbara) Anne Cameron   (born August 20, 1938 in Nanaimo, British Columbia) (died November 30, 2022 in Tahsis, British Columbia) was a Canadian novelist, poet, screenwriter, short story and children's book writer.

She legally changed her name from her birth name, Barbara Cameron, to Cam Hubert and later changed her name from Cam Hubert to Anne Cameron. She has written under these names.

Much of her work was inspired by Northwest Coast First Nations' mythology and culture and centered women as characters asserting non-conformist independence.  Cameron is a feminist and has been influential in bringing the injustices of patriarchal and colonial systems under scrutiny in her body of work.

Personal 
(Barbara) Anne Cameron was the daughter of Annie Cameron (née Graham) and Matthew Angus Cameron.  Cameron has described her family as "hard-working, dirt poor," and highlights the peace and order she found in reading books as a child.  She began writing at a young age, "scribbling notes on toilet paper," and attended high school in Nanaimo, British Columbia.  At fourteen her mother gifted her a typewriter "even though she could not afford it." Cameron did not complete high school, and resisted certain subjects like home economics, preferring instead to spend time in the library.

She lived briefly in Ontario, and in the mainland Vancouver area, but spent most of her life on the Sunshine Coast and Vancouver Island. She married and divorced, and parented 5 children, Alex Hubert, Erin Hubert, Pierre Hubert, Marianne Hubert Jones, and Tara Hubert Miller.  Lacking the formal school credits to attend university, and later declined admission by Simon Fraser University as a mature student applicant, Cameron developed her writing through her own ingenuity and collaborative projects with friends.  She especially credits time spent listening to storytellers; in particular she references Welsh coal-mining women and North English women storytellers, Chinese elder and Indigenous elder storytellers.

Writing
She included details about the First Nations storytellers whose stories are reflected in her books in the foreword. She wrote for the Indian Voice  in Vancouver. (founded in 1969 by British Columbia Indian Homemakers' Association) and engaged her writing as a form of activism, winning a centennial play-writing contest for Windigo, a stage adaptation of a documentary poem about racism.  One outcome of winning the contest was that the play toured the province and was performed by First Nations inmates in Matsqui Penitentiary, Abbotsford, British Columbia.  This experience led her to co-found the Tillicurn Theatre in 1974, a First Nations theatre group formed locally that toured British Columbia and performed "dramatizations of legends and a theatre piece based on the death of Fred Quilt, a Chilcotin man who died of ruptured guts after an encounter with two RCMP on a back road at night." In an interview with Alan Twigg, referring to this work, she explained that "It started out political. It has become very personal."

Among other jobs, she worked as a student psychiatric nurse (1955–57), as a medical assistant with the Royal Canadian Air Force (1957–59), an Instructor in creative writing at Malaspina College, Powell River, and writer in residence at Simon Fraser University, the institution that had declined her admission as a mature university student years earlier on the basis of insufficient high school credits. Some screenplays were written under her name at the time, Cam Hubert; Cameron later added novels and children's books to her body of work.

Her bestselling Daughters of Copper Woman (1981), first printed by the Vancouver feminist collective Press Gang Publishers, is regarded as "a groundbreaking bestseller and women's studies staple" has been reprinted thirteen times. Writing an academic article about Cameron's work, Christine St. Peter contacted Press Gang Publishers and was told that "women from all over the world write to describe how reading Daughters of Copper Woman has changed their lives" (interview with Della McCreary, 20 July 1987; St. Peter, 1989, at page 500). Following the breakup of Press Gang Publishers, Cameron was able to find a supportive home at Harbour Publishing of Madeira Park, BC, where she remained the bulk of her writing career, producing over thirty titles in poetry, fiction and children's literature.

Cameron's writing focused on British Columbia First Nations lives, mainly in coastal communities such as Powell River and Nanaimo.  Her characters explore spirituality, resilience, sexuality, resistance, and healing, and encounter violence, oppression, misogyny, and poverty.  Many stories reflect specific Indigenous cultures and myths, and offer a critical feminist, anti-colonial narrative that cherishes creation stories and oral histories (e.g. Daughters of Copper Woman, based on Nootka myths and legends, and Dzelarhons: Myths of the Northwest Coast).  The "destructive impact of white culture on the Indian population, particularly on the cultural position of women" is powerfully communicated in Daughters of Copper Woman (1981), alongside "women's strength, courage, sisterhood, and transmission of knowledge for survival [...] considered basic to the well-being of their society." In an interview with Alan Twigg, owner and publisher of the newspaper, B.C. BookWorld, Cameron explained "We identify with British Columbia much more than we identify as Canadians" (1988 Interview by Alan Twigg).  The royalties from her book sales have supported causes that center Indigenous and First Nations' priorities (2002 interview with author reproduced on BC Book Look).

Cameron published 'A Short Story' in the 1981 'Lesbiantics' issue of Fireweed, a quarterly feminist publication, and has been recognised for foregrounding "the pleasure of women living together and the humour, for example, of a lesbian couple nailing the sign 'Women' over their outhouse" (p. 651 in the Oxford Companion to Canadian Literature, 2nd Ed.). Cameron has said of the characters in her stories, "Their being queer is not why they are in my stories. It's just part of who they are." She is celebrated as a queer writer, identifies as lesbian, and currently lives in Tahsis, British Columbia with her partner.

In 2010 she was awarded the 16th annual George Woodcock Lifetime Achievement Award, commemorated by the installation of a plaque with her name in the Writers' Walk at the Vancouver Public Library on Georgia Street in Vancouver, British Columbia.

Works

Film
Ticket to Heaven (1981)
Dreamspeaker (1979)
Drying Up the Streets
A Matter of Choice
The Tin Flute (adaptation of a novel by Gabrielle Roy)
Mistress Madeline
Bomb Squad
Homecoming

Stage 

 Cantata: The Story of Sylvia Stark (1989)

Fiction
 Dreamspeaker (1979)
 Daughters of Copper Woman (1981)
 The Journey (1982)
 Dzelarhons: Mythology of the Northwest Coast (1986)
 Child of Her People (1987)
 Stubby Amberchuk & The Holy Grail (1987)
 Tales of the Cairds (1989)
 Women, Kids & Huckleberry Wine (1989)
 South of an Unnamed Creek (1989)
 Bright's Crossing (1990)
 Escape to Beulah (1990)
 Kick the Can (1991)
 A Whole Brass Band (1992)
 Wedding Cakes, Rats and Rodeo Queens (1994)
 DeeJay & Betty (1994)
 The Whole Fam Damily (1995)
 Selkie (1996)
 Aftermath (1999)
 Those Lancasters (2000)
 Sarah's Children (2001)
 Hardscratch Row (2002)
 Family Resemblances (2003)
 Dahlia Cassidy (2004)

Audio 

 Loon and Raven Tales (1996)

Poetry
 Earth Witch (1983; reprinted five times)
 The Annie Poems (1987)
Windigo (1974)

Children's books
 How Raven Freed the Moon (1985); Illustrated by Tara Miller
 How the Loon Lost her Voice (1985); Illustrated by Tara Miller
 Raven Returns the Water (1987); Illustrated by Nelle Olsen
 Orca's Song (1987); Illustrated by Nelle Olsen
 Lazy Boy (1988); Illustrated by Nelle Olsen
 Spider Woman (1988); Illustrated by Nelle Olsen
 Raven & Snipe (1991); Illustrated by Gaye Hammond
 Raven Goes Berrypicking (1991); Illustrated by Gaye Hammond
 The Gumboot Geese (1992); Illustrated by Jane Huber
 This Place Of World (2014) Ilustrated by Ann Cameron 
T'aal: The One Who Takes Bad Children (1998)

Awards 
1972: Alberta Poetry Competition 
1973: Bliss Carman Award for Poetry, Banff School of Fine Arts 
1973: Alberta Poetry Competition 
1979: Gibson's Literary Award
1979: Etrog for best Screenplay - Dreamspeaker (screen) [In 1968, a bronze award statuette was designed by sculptor Sorel Etrog and the award was often referred to as an "Etrog". The awards were formally renamed Genie Awards in 1980.]
1979: Gibson Award for Literature - Dreamspeaker (novel)
1981: Nominated "Genie Award for Best Adapted Screenplay" - Ticket to Heaven
1987: Gemini Award for Best Pay Television Dramatic Series- Mistress Madeline
2010: Winner of the 16th George Woodcock Lifetime Achievement Award

References

External links 
 Anne Cameron's official website

1938 births
Living people
Canadian women novelists
Canadian women poets
Screenwriters from British Columbia
People from Nanaimo
Writers from British Columbia
Canadian lesbian writers
Canadian women screenwriters
20th-century Canadian novelists
20th-century Canadian poets
21st-century Canadian novelists
Canadian LGBT poets
Canadian LGBT novelists
Canadian women short story writers
20th-century Canadian women writers
21st-century Canadian women writers
20th-century Canadian short story writers
21st-century Canadian short story writers
21st-century Canadian LGBT people
Lesbian screenwriters
Lesbian novelists
Lesbian poets
Canadian LGBT screenwriters